Oskar Rümmele (May 6, 1890 – June 29, 1975) was a German politician of the Christian Democratic Union (CDU) and former member of the German Bundestag.

Life 
Rümmele had been a member of the German Bundestag since its first election from 1949 to 1957. He represented the constituency of Offenburg in parliament as a directly elected member. In the first legislative period, he was deputy chairman of the Bundestag's Committee on Transportation and in the second (1953 to 1957) its chairman.

Literature

References

1890 births
1975 deaths
Members of the Bundestag for Baden-Württemberg
Members of the Bundestag 1953–1957
Members of the Bundestag 1949–1953
Members of the Bundestag for the Christian Democratic Union of Germany